Bon Ton; or, High Life Above Stairs is a comedy act in two acts by David Garrick, first performed at the Theatre Royal, Drury Lane on 18 March 1775. According to Garrick's introductory notice to the play, it had been written many years before.

References

Plays by David Garrick
1775 plays